The Stoneham Independent, founded in 1870, is published each Wednesday from offices at 1 Arrow Drive, Woburn, Massachusetts, United States.

Sisters 
The Stoneham Independent's parent company, Woburn Daily Times Inc., also publishes a daily newspaper and two additional weekly newspapers in adjoining towns, and a weekly supplement, Middlesex East.

Other Daily Times publications are:
 The Daily Times Chronicle, a daily serving Burlington, Reading, Wakefield, Winchester and Woburn, Massachusetts.
 The Tewksbury Town Crier and Wilmington Town Crier, published each Wednesday in Tewksbury and Wilmington, Massachusetts.

References

External links
 The Stoneham Independent Website
 Woburnonline -- Daily Times Chronicle Website

Newspapers published in Massachusetts
Mass media in Middlesex County, Massachusetts